Donat may refer to:

People
 Camille Donat (born 1988), French triathlete
 Donat, Bishop of Dublin (died 1074), first bishop of Dublin
 Robert Donat (1905–1958), English actor
 Peter Donat (1928–2018), Canadian actor, nephew of Robert
 Richard Donat (born 1941), Canadian actor, nephew of Robert
 Jan Piwnik (1912–1944), Polish World War II soldier who used the nom de guerre Donat
 Donat Savoie, Canadian anthropologist

Other uses
 Donat, Switzerland, a municipality 
 Donat of the Order of St John, contributor to its funds

See also
Donath (disambiguation)
Donatus (disambiguation)
Doughnut, a type of fried dough confection